Mikko Luoma (born ) is a Finnish former professional ice hockey defenceman, who played 3 games in the National Hockey League with the Edmonton Oilers. He most notably played in the Liiga and Elitserien.

Playing career
Luoma started his playing career with the Finnish JYP's youth team, playing for them from 1993 until 1998 when he stepped up in JYP's senior team in SM-liiga. In his first two seasons in SM-liiga he totalled 18 points over 104 games. From season 2000–01 to 2002–03 he played with Tappara, totalling 66 points in 164 games.

Luoma was selected by the Edmonton Oilers in the 6th round of the 2002 NHL Entry Draft, 181st overall, as an over-aged player. He only played one season in North America, largely in the American Hockey League with the Toronto Roadrunners, although he also saw some time with the Oilers.

After NHL and AHL, Luoma moved to Sweden and played in the Swedish elite league Elitserien with Malmö Redhawks in 2004–05 and Linköpings HC from season 2005–06 to 2006–07. For season 2007–08 he signed with HV71 and continued the season with winning the Swedish Championship.

He concluded his professional career after spending a single season in the Austrian Hockey League with Italian outfit, HC Bolzano in the 2016–17 season.

He is currently a European Amateur Scout for the Chicago Blackhawks of the NHL.

Career statistics

Regular season and playoffs

International

Awards and honours

References

External links

1976 births
Atlant Moscow Oblast players
Bolzano HC players
Chicago Blackhawks scouts
Edmonton Oilers draft picks
Edmonton Oilers players
Finnish expatriate ice hockey players in Russia
Finnish ice hockey defencemen
HV71 players
JYP Jyväskylä players
Linköping HC players
Living people
Modo Hockey players
Sportspeople from Jyväskylä
Tappara players
Toronto Roadrunners players